In the 1970 Intertoto Cup no knock-out rounds were contested, and therefore no winner was declared.

Group stage
The teams were divided into thirteen groups of four teams each, five in the 'A' region and eight in the 'B' region.

Group A1

Group A2

Group A3

Group Phase

Group A4

Group A5

Group B1

Group B2

Group B3

Group B4

Group B5

Group B6

Group B7

Group B8

See also
 1970–71 European Cup
 1970–71 UEFA Cup Winners' Cup
 1970–71 Inter-Cities Fairs Cup

External links
  by Pawel Mogielnicki

1970
4